is a railway station in Edogawa City, Tokyo, Japan. Its station number is S-18. The station opened on 14 September 1986.

Platforms
Ichinoe Station consists of a single island platform served by two tracks.

Surrounding area
The station is located underground southeast of the intersection of Tokyo Metropolitan Routes 50 (Imai-kaidō) and 318 (Kannana-dōri). There are several apartment buildings immediately around the station, with single-family residences beyond. The Shin-Naka River lies to the east. Other points of interest include:
 Tokyo Prefectural Kasai Commercial High School
 Edogawa Municipal Ichinoe Elementary School
 Edogawa Municipal Ichinoe No. 2 Elementary School
 Edogawa Municipal Ichinoe Junior High School
 Mizue-Ōhashi bridge
 Edogawa Municipal Mizue Elementary School

Connecting bus service
Stop: Ichinoe-Ekimae
 Stop 1 
 Shinko 22: for Shin-Koiwa-Ekimae, Funabori-Ekimae (Toei Bus)
 Stop 2
 Shinko 22: for Kasai-Ekimae (Toei)
 Kame 26: for Imai (Toei)
 Stop 3
 Kasai 22: for Kasai-Ekimae via Kaminari (Toei)
 Shinko 29-Otsu: for Haruemachi terminal (Toei)
 Stop 4
 Ko 72: For Koiwa Station, Edogawa Sports Land (Keisei Bus)
 Stop 5
 Kame 26: for Kameido-Ekimae (Toei)
 Shinko 29-Otsu: for Higashi-Shin-Koiwa 4-chōme (Toei)
 Ko 76: for Kasai-Ekimae (Keisei)
 Stop 6
 Ko 76: Koiwa Station via Nanushiyashiki (Keisei)
 Stop 7
 Rinkai 28-Kō: for Kasairinkaikōen-Ekimae via Kannana and Kasai Station (Toei)
 Rinkai 28-Otsu: for Rinkai-Shako-mae via Kannana and Kasai Station (Toei)
 Kasai 22: for Rinkai-Shako (Toei)
 Shinko 29: for Kasai-Ekimae (Toei)
 Shinko 30: for Tokyo Rinkai Hospital (Toei)
 Stop 8
 Rinkai 28-Kō, Rinkai 28-Otsu: For Ichinoebashi-Nishizume (Toei)
 Shinko 29-Kō, Shinko-30: for Higashi-Shin-Koiwa 4-chōme (Toei)
 Kan 07: Express for Koiwa Station (Keisei)
 Kan 08: Express for Kameari Station (Keisei)
 Stop 9
 Shinko 20: for Higashi-Shin-Koiwa 4-chōme (Toei, Keisei Town Bus)
 Stop 10
 for Haneda Airport (Keisei, Airport Transport Service)
 for Narita Airport (Keisei)
 Kan 07, Kan 08: Express for Kasairinkaikōen-Ekimae, Tokyo Disney Resort (Keisei)

Stop: Ichinoe-Eki-Kannanaguchi
 Ko 76: for Kasai-Ekimae, Koiwa Station (Keisei)

Line
 Tokyo Metropolitan Bureau of Transportation - Toei Shinjuku Line

References

External links

 Tokyo Metropolitan Bureau of Transportation: Ichinoe Station 

Railway stations in Japan opened in 1986
Railway stations in Tokyo
1986 establishments in Japan